The Mgbo are an Igboid ethnic group in Ebonyi state of southeastern Nigeria.

Notes

Igbo clans
Igbo subgroups